is a Japanese actor and voice actor from Oketo, Hokkaidō attached to Gekidan Mingei. He is a graduate of Hokkaidō Kitami Hokuto High School and Ritsumeikan University's College of Business Administration.

Filmography

Television animation
Eat-Man (1997) – Zolmin
Arc the Lad (1999) – Bibiga
Pecola (2002) – Pecolius
Eyeshield 21 (2005) – Musashi's father
Play Ball (2005) – Taniguchi's father
Fist of the Blue Sky (2006) – Lǐ Yǒng-Jiàn
Kiba (2006) – Sebastian
Play Ball 2nd (2006) – Taniguchi's father
A Spirit of the Sun (2006) – Ozu
Claymore (2007) – Bishop Kamari
Golgo 13 (2008) – Newsmonger
Michiko to Hatchin (2008) – Hoan
Sanzoku no Musume Rōnya (2014) – Noddle-Pete

Theatrical animation
Naruto the Movie 3: Guardians of the Crescent Moon Kingdom (2006) – Shabadaba

Net animation
Japan Sinks: 2020, Kunio Ashida

Dubbing roles
Lee Arenberg
Pirates of the Caribbean: The Curse of the Black Pearl – Pintel
Pirates of the Caribbean: Dead Man's Chest – Pintel
Pirates of the Caribbean: At World's End – Pintel
50 First Dates – Dr. Joseph Keats (Dan Aykroyd)
Alien 3 – Harold Andrews (Brian Glover)
The Assignment – Amos (Ben Kingsley)
Asteroid (1997 TV Asahi edition) – Dr. Matthew Rogers (Michael Weatherly)
Behind Enemy Lines – Piquet (Joaquim de Almeida)
A Bridge Too Far (2007 DVD edition) – Frederick Browning (Dirk Bogarde)
The Bridge on the River Kwai (2006 DVD edition) – Major Warden (Jack Hawkins)
Broken Arrow (2002 TV Asahi edition) – Colonel Max Wilkins (Delroy Lindo)
Charlie's Angels (2003 TV Asahi edition) – Roger Corwin (Tim Curry)
Cold Case – John Stillman (John Finn)
Dae Jang Geum – Kang Deok Goo (Im Hyun-sik)
Desperate Housewives – Doctor Albert Goldfine (Sam Lloyd)
Diamonds Are Forever (2006 DVD edition) – Ernst Stavro Blofeld (Charles Gray)
Dragonheart: A New Beginning – Master Kwan (Henry O)
Dudley Do-Right – Snidely Whiplash (Alfred Molina)
End of Days – Dr. Abel (Udo Kier)
The Fifth Element (Blu-ray edition) – Father Vito Cornelius (Ian Holm)
The Godfather (2001 DVD edition) – Moe Greene (Alex Rocco)
The Godfather (2008 Blu-Ray edition) – Philip Tattaglia (Victor Rendina), Amerigo Bonasera
Hollow Man – Dr. Howard Kramer (William Devane)
The Host – Park Hee-bong (Byun Hee-bong)
Indiana Jones and the Last Crusade (2009 WOWOW edition) – Walter Donovan (Julian Glover)
Jaws (2005 DVD edition) – Mayor Larry Vaughn (Murray Hamilton)
The Ladykillers – The General (Tzi Ma)
Lara Croft: Tomb Raider (2004 Fuji TV edition) – Distinguished Gentleman (Richard Johnson)
Licence to Kill (2006 DVD edition) – Milton Krest (Anthony Zerbe)
The Man with the Golden Gun (2006 DVD edition) – Francisco Scaramanga (Christopher Lee)
The Mummy Returns (2006 Fuji TV edition) – Baltus Hafez (Alun Armstrong)
Munich – Ephraim (Geoffrey Rush)
Never Talk to Strangers – Henry Taylor (Len Cariou)
Out for a Kill – Wong Dai
Payback (2001 NTV edition) – Phil (John Glover)
Pearl Harbor (2004 TV Asahi edition) – Captain Thurman (Dan Aykroyd)
Plunkett & Macleane – Thief Taker General Chance (Ken Stott)
Proof of Life – Ted Fellner (Anthony Heald)
RoboCop 3 (1996 TV Asahi edition) – Kanemitsu (Mako Iwamatsu)
Sahara – Admiral James Sandecker (William H. Macy)
Saw V – FBI Agent Dan Erickson (Mark Rolston)
Scarface (2004 DVD edition) — Bernstein (Harris Yulin)
Shaolin Soccer (International version) – "Golden Leg" Fung (Ng Man-tat)
Son of the Mask (2009 NTV edition) – Doctor Arthur Neuman (Ben Stein)
Spy Kids (Netflix/Hulu edition) – Alexander Minion (Tony Shalhoub)
Succession – Logan Roy (Brian Cox)
Sudden Death – Joshua Foss (Powers Boothe)
U Turn – Blind Indian (Jon Voight)
The West Wing – Doctor Stanley Keyworth (Adam Arkin)

Animation
Batman: The Brave and the Bold – Wildcat
Jang Geum's Dream – Kang Deok Goo
Bionicle 2: Legends of Metru Nui
Toy Story 2 – Emperor Zurg
Toy Story 3 – Zurg

Other
Star Tours (Darth Vader)
Pirates of the Caribbean (Pintel)
Toy Story Mania! (Zurg)

References

External links
 Official agency profile 
 

1945 births
Living people
Japanese male video game actors
Japanese male voice actors
Male voice actors from Hokkaido